Crowe may refer to:

 Crowe (surname), origin of the name and a list of people
 Crowe baronets, a former baronetcy of England
 Crowe Global, an accounting, consulting, and technology firm from the USA
 Crowe Lake, Peterborough County, Ontario, Canada
 Crowe River, in Canada
 Crowe sign, or Crowe's sign, a medical sign that is used in the diagnosis of neurofibromatosis

See also
 Crow (disambiguation)
 Crow (surname)
 Crowe & Dunlevy, an American law firm
 Crowell (disambiguation)